Laurent Tirard (born 18 February 1967) is a French film director and screenwriter.

Life and career
Laurent Tirard grew up admiring American films, such as those by Steven Spielberg.  He studied film making at New York University, worked as a script reader for Warner Bros. studios, then became a journalist and worked for the French film magazine Studio for six years.

There, he conducted a series of interviews on film making which have been published as a book under the title Moviemakers' Master Class: Private Lessons from the World's Foremost Directors. From Woody Allen to David Cronenberg, the Coen brothers to Lars Von Trier, all film directors run up against the same essential concerns: how to direct actors, for example, or whether to pre-plan camera angles. In interviewing these and 16 other notable filmmakers, Tirard found notable affinities between seemingly dissimilar directors.  The book has also been published in France, Canada, England, Italy, Spain and Brazil.

In 1997, he left the magazine and began writing scripts for film and television, while directing two short films, in 1999 and 2000. He wrote and directed his first feature, The Story of My Life, in 2004, co-wrote the hugely successful Prête-moi ta main (How to Get Married and Stay Single) for Alain Chabat in 2005, then wrote and directed his second film, Molière, the following year. Molière was entered into the 29th Moscow International Film Festival.

He directed the film adaptation of the popular French children's book Le petit Nicolas: Little Nicholas in 2009 and its sequel Nicholas on Holiday in 2014.

Filmography

References

External links

 

1967 births
Living people
French film directors
French male screenwriters
French screenwriters